Cities and towns under republic's jurisdiction
Cherkessk (Черкесск) (capital)
Karachayevsk (Карачаевск)
Towns under the town's jurisdiction:
Teberda (Теберда)
Urban-type settlements under the town's jurisdiction:
Dombay resort settlement (Домбай)
Elbrussky (Эльбрусский)
Ordzhonikidzevsky (Орджоникидзевский)
Districts:
Abazinsky (Абазинский)
Adyge-Khablsky (Адыге-Хабльский)
Karachayevsky (Карачаевский)
Urban-type settlements under the district's jurisdiction:
Novy Karachay (Новый Карачай)
Pravokubansky (Правокубанский)
Khabezsky (Хабезский)
Malokarachayevsky (Малокарачаевский)
Nogaysky (Ногайский)
Prikubansky (Прикубанский)
Urban-type settlements under the district's jurisdiction:
Udarny (Ударный)
Urupsky (Урупский)
Urban-type settlements under the district's jurisdiction:
Mednogorsky (Медногорский)
Ust-Dzhegutinsky (Усть-Джегутинский)
Towns under the district's jurisdiction:
Ust-Dzheguta (Усть-Джегута)
Zelenchuksky (Зеленчукский)

References